The Platinum Collection is a 2006 compilation album by Gary Moore. There are three CDs each covering a different category: Rock, Blues and Live.

Track listing

Disc 1 (Rock)
"Parisienne Walkways"
"Out in the Fields"
"Over the Hills and Far Away"
"Empty Rooms ('84 Remix)"
"Friday on My Mind"
"After the War"
"Wild Frontier"
"The Loner"
"Shapes of Things"
"Wishing Well"
"Don't Take Me for a Loser"
"Hold on to Love"
"Blood of Emeralds"
"Take a Little Time"
"Like Angels"
"One Good Reason"
"Johnny Boy"

Disc 2 (Blues)
"Still Got the Blues (For You)"
"Cold Day in Hell"
"Oh Pretty Woman"
"Story of the Blues"
"Separate Ways"
"Since I Met You Baby"
"I Loved Another Woman"
"Woke Up This Morning"
"Further on Up the Road"
"The Sky Is Crying"
"Left Me with the Blues"
"Mean Cruel Woman"
"The Blues Is Alright"
"If You Be My Baby"
"Need Your Love So Bad"

Disc 3 (Live)
"Murder in the Skies" (Live)
"Military Man" (Live)
"White Knuckles" (Live)
"Empty Rooms" (Live)
"Out in the Fields" (Live)
"Back on the Streets" (Live)
"Stop Messin' Around" (Live)
"Cold Day in Hell" (Live)
"Midnight Blues" (Live)
"King of the Blues" (Live)
"Caldonia" (Live)
"Cold, Cold Feeling" (Live)
"Parisienne Walkways" (Live)

Personnel
Gary Moore - guitar, vocals
Bob Daisley - bass guitar
Darrin Mooney - drums
Jim Watson - keyboards
Phil Lynott - bass guitar, vocals
Neil Carter - keyboard
Albert King - guitar

References

Gary Moore compilation albums
Gary Moore live albums
2006 live albums
2006 compilation albums